Mary Hon is an actress from TVB in Hong Kong.

Filmography

TV dramas

Personal life 
Hon's husband is To Yin Gor. In 2019, Hon was diagnosed with meningitis and she was hospitalized.

References

External links

1954 births
Living people
TVB veteran actors
Hong Kong television actresses
20th-century Hong Kong actresses
21st-century Hong Kong actresses